The Louis Bolduc House, also known as Maison Bolduc, is a historic house museum at 123 South Main Street in Ste. Geneviève, Missouri. It is an example of poteaux sur solle ("posts-on-sill") construction, and is located in the first European settlement in the present-day state of Missouri. The first historic structure in Ste. Genevieve to be authentically restored, the house is a prime example of the traditional French Colonial architecture of the early 18th century in North America and was designated in 1970 as a National Historic Landmark.

History
Ste. Genevieve was founded in the mid-eighteenth century by French-Canadian settlers, most of whom migrated from villages on the east bank of the Mississippi River, such as Prairie du Rocher, Illinois. Because of repeated flooding from the Mississippi River, with an especially bad occurrence in 1785, they decided to relocate to a higher site further away from the river.

In 1792 Louis Bolduc, a successful merchant and trader, who also had lead mines to the west, built a one-story house at the new village site, about three miles north of the first. First to be built in the one-story house was a large "keeping room", about 26' × 27', where the family conducted most of its activities. It has a large fireplace at the north end, and a wide-plank puncheon floor, made of logs cut flat on only one side, with the curved side laid down. Storage for lead, corn and other goods was in the attic above the room. In 1793, Bolduc had the wide hallway and a large sleeping chamber added, the latter also about 26' × 27' in size. Historians believe the sleeping chamber had two "sleeping cells," areas partially walled off for privacy: one for him and his wife and one shared by their three children. Bolduc had tall windows with glass installed in both large rooms, another mark of his wealth.

The walls of the house were built with heavy oak timbers set about six inches apart and infilled with bousillage, a mixture of mud, straw, and horsehair that hardened to a cement-like texture. Sometimes other animal or human hair was added to the mixture. Diagonal timbers on each supporting wall added stability. The steep hip roof, made of cedar shakes, was supported by heavy, hand-hewn Norman trusses held together by mortise and tenon joinery. It extends over the four sides of the house's porches to provide shade and cooling. The house is surrounded by a reconstructed stockade fence typical of the time (to keep out livestock that roamed in the area). Gardens have been reconstructed on the grounds.

Located at 123 South Main, the property was owned by Bolduc family descendants until the 1940s. Furnished with pieces typical of the period, today it is operated as a historic house museum. Three items are original to the Bolduc family. The property has been owned since 1949 and operated by The National Society of The Colonial Dames of America in the State of Missouri. It was restored in 1956–1957, under the direction of the architectural historian, Dr. Ernest Allen Connally. As may be seen by a comparison of photos below, the house was restored to show its original colonial style, whose elements were intact under later changes. In 1970 the house was designated a National Historic Landmark. It is a contributing property in the Ste. Genevieve Historic District, which has National Historic Landmark status.

Photos of the Bolduc House

Recent

Archival

See also
List of National Historic Landmarks in Missouri
List of the oldest buildings in Missouri
National Register of Historic Places listings in Ste. Genevieve County, Missouri

References

External links

Historic house museums in Missouri
Museums in Ste. Genevieve County, Missouri
National Historic Landmarks in Missouri
Houses on the National Register of Historic Places in Missouri
Historic American Buildings Survey in Missouri
Houses completed in 1785
French-American culture in Missouri
French-Canadian culture in Missouri
French colonial architecture
French
Individually listed contributing properties to historic districts on the National Register in Missouri
National Society of the Colonial Dames of America
Houses in Ste. Genevieve County, Missouri
National Register of Historic Places in Ste. Genevieve County, Missouri
National Historic Landmark District contributing properties